Lyon Observatory is located in Saint-Genis-Laval, a commune in the Rhône department in eastern France, near Lyon. Founded in 1878, the entire facility was listed as a historical site on 9 May 2007.

In 1867, Paris astronomer Charles André requested of the prefect of Rhone, that a new observatory be created. In 1873, a commission offered to establish a facility in Sainte-Foy-lès-Lyon. André sought to have the site built in Saint-Genis-Laval. On March 11, 1878, Patrice de MacMahon approved the creation of the Lyon Observatory. André was appointed its first director.

Research 
Lyon Observatory has worked on polychromatic artificial stars  for adaptive optics systems, made by a laser.

Directors 
 1878-1912: Charles André (1842-1912)
 1912-1933: Jean Mascart (1872-1935)
 1933-1966 : Jean Dufay (1896-1967)
 1966-1976: Joseph-Henri Bigay (1910-1982)
 1976-1986: Guy Monnet (1941-)
 1986-1995: Jean-Claude Ribes (1940-)
 1995-2005: Roland Bacon (1956-)
 2005-2015: Bruno Guiderdoni
 2015-... : Isabelle Daniel

See also
 List of astronomical observatories

References

External links

 
 Publications of Lyon Observatory digitalized on Paris Observatory digital library

Astronomical observatories in France
1878 establishments in France